Pt. Triyugi Narayan Mahavidyalaya, Mangalpur is a degree college in Kanpur Dehat district, Uttar Pradesh, India. The college is affiliated with CSJM University Kanpur. This college is located on Derapur-Mangalpur Road at Mangalpur in subdivision Derapur, Kanpur Dehat district  and at a distance  from railway station Jhinjhak (NCR)

Facilities
Total land owned by college: 
The college has a playground with sports facilities, rich library, Science lab., Psycho lab., Education Tech. etc.

Management
The college is managed by society named Pt. Triyugi Narayan Adarsh Shiksha Samiti Vill.& Post Mangalpur, Derapur, Kanpur Dehat, Uttar Pradesh, India under registered Society Act 1860
President: Rajendra Prasad Dixit
Manager: Mrs. Manju

Faculties
Arts
Science
B.Ed.

References

External links

Universities and colleges in Uttar Pradesh
Education in Kanpur Dehat district
Colleges affiliated to Chhatrapati Shahu Ji Maharaj University